Toyin Ojora-Saraki  (born 6 September 1964) is a global health advocate, healthcare philanthropist and the Founder-President of Wellbeing Foundation Africa.

Early life and education
Toyin Saraki was born into the Ojora and Adele royal families of Lagos, Nigeria, as the daughter of the Yoruba aristocrat Oloye Adekunle Ojora, the Otunba of Lagos, and granddaughter of Omoba Abdulaziz Ojora, the Olori Omo-Oba of Lagos. On her maternal side, she is the daughter of the Erelu Oodua, Iyaloye Ojuolape Ojora (nee Akinfe), and granddaughter of Iyaloye Sabainah Akinkugbe, who was also herself a chieftess. The Akinfes are a titled family of industrialists from Ondo State.

She had her elementary education at St Saviour's School, Ikoyi, Lagos, and Holy Child College Lagos, after which she went to the United Kingdom and attended Roedean School, Brighton. She achieved her L.L.B degree in Law from the London School of Oriental and African Studies and her L.L.M in International Economic Law from King's College London, both of the University of London. She returned to Nigeria and was called to the Nigerian Bar in 1989.

Charity and philanthropy
As Founder-President of Wellbeing Foundation Africa (WBFA), Mrs Toyin Saraki is a Nigerian philanthropist with two decades of advocacy covering maternal, newborn and child health, gender-based discrimination and violence, improving education, socio-economic empowerment and community livelihoods in Africa. She is a global health advocate of Sustainable Development Goals in Nigeria, reducing the rate of maternal and infant mortality. She also launched a social media campaigns through Wellbeing Foundation Africa called #MaternalMonday in 2012, and #WASHWednesday, #ThriveThursday and #FrontlineFriday in 2018, to raise awareness on key issues in women children and adolescents health and nutrition, gender equality, water sanitation and hygiene, and frontline healthworkers. in Africa.

She contributed to the establishment of the Lifestream Charity in 1993 and is an advocate of the United Nations Every Woman Every Child campaign. She is on the board of the Global Foundation for the Elimination of Domestic Violence and the board of the Africa Justice Foundation.

Saraki was appointed to the International Steering Council of ICPD25 in 2019, is a Board Observer to the WHO Partnership for Maternal Newborn and Child Health PMNCH, and is also a Special Advisor to the WHO Africa Regional Office, Newborn Champion for Save the Children Nigeria, Universal Health Coverage Champion by Devex, United Nations Population Fund UNFPA Family Planning Champion, White Ribbon Alliance Global Champion, and was appointed the Inaugural Global Goodwill Ambassador to the International Confederation of Midwives in 2014.

Personal life
As the hereditary Princess Royal of the Ijora Kingdom and Iganmu Lands, Lagos, and the Yon Sabuke of Kaiama Kingdom, Kwara, she was installed as the Erelu Bobajiro of Iru Land, Lagos, in June 2021. She is married to Senator Bukola Saraki, a former president of the Nigerian Senate who holds the title of the Waziri of the Ilorin Emirate in the Nigerian chieftaincy system. They have four children.

References

External links
Website
Facebook page
Twitter page
Wellbeing Foundation Africa
Videos
#MaternalMonday
Toyin Saraki Affirms Her Integrity [vanguard]
Toyin Saraki Affirms Her Integrity [All Africa]

1964 births
Living people
Alumni of King's College London
Nigerian philanthropists
Alumni of the University of London
Nigerian women lawyers
Spouses of Nigerian state governors
Toyin
Yoruba women philanthropists
Yoruba women lawyers
Lawyers from Lagos
Yoruba women in politics
20th-century Nigerian lawyers
21st-century Nigerian lawyers
Ojora family
20th-century women lawyers
21st-century women lawyers
People educated at Roedean School, East Sussex
Holy Child College alumni